The 2004 Primera División de Chile season was both 75th and 76th season of top-flight football in Chile.

Torneo Apertura

The 2004 Torneo Apertura was the season’s first tournament which Universidad de Chile won its twelfth league title after beating Cobreloa in the final 4–2 on penalties with goalkeeper Johnny Herrera scoring the winning goal.

Qualification stage

Group standings

Aggregate table

Repechaje

Playoffs

First round

Knockout stage

Finals

Top goalscorers

Torneo Clausura

The 2004 Torneo Clausura was the season’s second tournament. Universidad de Chile was the defending champions.

Qualification stage

Group standings

Aggregate table

Repechaje

Playoffs

First round

Knockout stage

Finals

Top goalscorers

References

External links
RSSSF Chile 2004

Apertura